Jean-Pierre Nicolas (born 22 January 1945) is a retired French professional rally driver who competed mainly in the 1970s.

Nicolas took five WRC event wins in the World Rally Championship. His best result in the drivers' championship was second with 31 points, after Markku Alén (53) and ahead of Hannu Mikkola (30), in the 1978 FIA Cup for Drivers.

Nicolas was born in Marseille. He was the Sporting Director for Peugeot in the WRC until 2005, around the time the 206 WRC and the short-lived factory-spec 307 WRC from 2004 to 2005 was the official works Peugeot car.
He was then the FIA Intercontinental Rally Challenge's Motorsport Development Manager.

WRC wins
{|class="wikitable"
!   #  
! Event
! Season
! Co-driver
! Car
|-
| 1
|  17ème Tour de Corse
| 1973
| Michel Vial
| Alpine-Renault A110 1800
|-
| 2
|  19ème Rallye du Maroc
| 1976
| Michel Gamet
| Peugeot 504
|-
| 3
|  46ème Rallye Automobile de Monte-Carlo
| 1978
| Vincent Laverne
| Porsche 911
|-
| 4
|  26th Safari Rally
| 1978
| Jean-Claude Lefèbvre
| Peugeot 504 V6 Coupé
|-
| 5
|  10ème Rallye Bandama Côte d'Ivoire
| 1978
| Michel Gamet
| Peugeot 504 V6 Coupé
|}

Complete IMC results

References

1945 births
French rally drivers
World Rally Championship drivers
Living people
24 Hours of Le Mans drivers
French racing drivers
World Sportscar Championship drivers
Deputies of the 12th National Assembly of the French Fifth Republic
Deputies of the 13th National Assembly of the French Fifth Republic

Peugeot Sport drivers